There are over 20,000 Grade II* listed buildings in England. This page is a list of these buildings in the district of Christchurch in Dorset.

Listed buildings

|}

See also
Listed buildings in Christchurch, Dorset
Grade I listed buildings in Dorset
Grade II* listed buildings in Dorset
 Grade II* listed buildings in Bournemouth
 Grade II* listed buildings in East Dorset
 Grade II* listed buildings in North Dorset
 Grade II* listed buildings in Poole (borough)
 Grade II* listed buildings in Purbeck (district)
 Grade II* listed buildings in West Dorset
 Grade II* listed buildings in Weymouth and Portland

Notes

External links

 
Lists of Grade II* listed buildings in Dorset